Beijing 101 Middle School is a public coeducational secondary school in Haidian, Beijing. It offers programs from grades 7 to 12.

It is one of the beacon high schools accredited by Beijing Municipal Government. It has two affiliated schools.

Campus

Beijing 101 Middle School is renowned for its study environment. Its 200,000 square meter campus is surrounded by the Old Summer Palace, one of China's most splendid imperial palaces. Dozens of ponds dot the whole campus. 13,000 square meters of 101 are covered by water. Peking University and Tsinghua University, known as the best two universities in mainland China, are both within half a mile.

The school has undergone reconstruction work since 2005. The school's academic facilities include a library housing 100,000 books and magazines, an electronic library, 100 classrooms with multi-media equipment, a lecture hall, a 700-people auditorium, an information center, a 300 m2 greenhouse supported by NASA and China Space Center. The school has two standard soccer fields, six tennis courts, 16 basketball courts, a 400-meter track and a gymnasium for volleyball, dancing and ping-pong.

History

Beijing 101 Middle School was founded in 1946.  The school was founded on the war-torn Zhangjiakou, a town in the nearby Hebei Province. Soon after 101's foundation, the Chinese Civil War begun and both students and teachers were forced to move. After two years of moving, the school entered Beijing City and built its first permanent campus in Xiyuan, Haidian District. This moving is known as "the Long March of 101".

In the first 20 years of its history, the school was only open to children of the country's top-ranking officers. Zhou Enlai, the former premier of China, once visited the school and encouraged students to achieve their dreams at 101. After Mao Zedong commented on 101's discriminate admission policies in 1964, the school was opened to all students disregard of their family backgrounds. Jiang Zemin, the former General Secretary of Communist Party and President of China, and Li Peng, the former Chairman of the National People's Congress (NPC), both congratulated the school and wrote couplets when the school celebrated its 50th anniversary in 1996. In 2003, premier Wen Jiabao visited the school and encouraged the students to carry on the school's rich traditions. During the 2008 Beijing Olympic Games, 101 was chosen to hold the Youth Camp of the XXIX Olympia.

Early history
 March 1946, Zhangjiakou Municipal School, the prototype of Beijing 101, was founded by the People's Liberation Army in Hebei Province.
 September 1946，Zhangjiakou Municipal School, Municipal Girls' School, Huimin Middle School evacuated from Zhangjiakou. The three schools moved across Taihang Mountains, arrived at Jianping County (now called Pingshan County), Hebei Province.
 November 1946, the three schools were united and named as Jin Cha Ji Frontline United Middle School (Chinese: 晋察冀边区联合中学).
 January 1948, the United Middle School moved to the suburb of Shijiazhuang, the capital of Hebei Province.
 August 1948, the Xingzhi Middle School was incorporated by the United Middle School, and the new school was named as Huabei Yucai Middle School (Chinese: 华北育才中学).
 January 1949, Huabei Yucai Middle School moved to Wanping, a small town southwest of Beijing City.
 May 1949, Huabei Yucai became a middle school affiliated to Peking Normal University.
 1951, based on the agreement of Zhou Enlai, the school built its first permanent campus in the Old Summer Palace.
 1955, the school was renamed as Beijing 101 Middle School according to the suggestion of Guo Moruo, a famous Chinese poet and author.

Principals of 101

Wang Yizhi, the second principal, is the most respected principal in 101's history. As a principal who had led the school for almost 30 years, through both Great Leap Forward and Cultural Revolution, Wang made substantial contributions to the school and its students.

Academics
Since 1946, Beijing 101 Middle School has been one of the best middle schools in China. Before the school was opened to society based on the non-discriminate admission policy, 101's special position had brought the school the best educational resources. Before the Education Department called for a change in public schools' admission standards several years ago, 101's student body composed of the top 5% of applicants from each year.  Over 80% of the students are enrolled in the country's key universities. 98% of 101's graduates get into colleges or universities each year, almost the highest rate in mainland China. In 2008, the liberal arts department sent 99.3% of its students to universities all around the world, the highest rate in several years.

Unlike most schools in mainland China, 101 runs a very intense independent study program. Over 10% of the students have independent science programs that might take them more than a year to finish. In 2006, an asteroid was named after Zhong Yuechen, a student at Beijing 101 High School, due to her newest biology discovery. The asteroid is now known as 21725 Zhongyuechen. 101 is also one of the few public schools in China which offers courses for more than five foreign languages.

Activities

101 was chosen as the Olympic Youth Camp of the Beijing XXIX Olympia. Students from more than 50 countries spent their Olympic summer at 101. Beijing 101 Middle School was also the last leg of Beijing XXIX Olympic's torch relay. The torch was ignited in Olympia, Greece, after 129 days of relay, passing 19 countries all around the world. The torch reached Beijing 101 Middle School and ended its journey in front of 101's Lecture Hall. Beijing 101 Middle School also hosted the 2007 Annual Summit of International School Connection (ISC). The school has built a relationship with the Olympic Delegation of Montenegro, a new country on the Balkan Peninsula.

The school's orchestra, Golden Sail (also known as Jinfan or 金帆), has travelled around the world in the last ten years. In August 2005, Golden Sail Orchestra won the first place of 34th International Youth Music Festival in Vienna, Austria. The school also has a girls' volleyball team which won second place in a national tournament in 2006.

101 holds a lot of speeches every year. Barry Marshall, the 2005 Nobel Medicine Prize winner, Kai-Fu Lee, the head of Google China, and dozens of scientists and scholars have made speeches at 101 in the last three years.

Notable alumni
 Xi Jinping, General Secretary of CPC and President of China
 Zeng Qinghong, former CPC Politburo Standing Committee member (2002–2007) and Vice-President (2003–2008) of China.
 Li Tieying, vice-president of the Standing Committee of the National People's Congress.
 Shi Guangnan, musician, known as the "People's Musician".
 Liu Qi, former Mayor (1999–2003) of Beijing, President of Beijing 2008 Olympic Organizing Committee.
 Liu Jingmin, vice-mayor of Beijing, vice president of Beijing 2008 Olympic Organizing Committee.
 Cui Yongyuan, talk show host of China Central Television.
 Zhang Meiying, vice chairman of the Chinese People's Political Consultative Conference (CPPCC).
 Xie Fei, film director, winner of the Gold Bear Prize for Best Film at the Berlin International Film Festival.
 Liao Hui, vice-chairman of the Chinese People's Political Consultative Conference (CPPCC), director of State Department's Hong Kong, Macau Affairs Branch.
 Carma Hinton, documentary filmmaker and professor.
 Hu Shuli, editor-in-chief of Caixin Media.
 Wu Shaozu, former director of the National Sports Committee.
 Bai Keming, former first-in-charge of Hainan province, president of CCP Hainan Branch.
 Wen Xingyu, actor, best known for his performance in I Love My Family (我爱我家）.
Zhang Lin, swimmer.
 Song Yuqi, singer, member of (G)I-dle
Liu He, Vice Premier of China. It is sometimes reported Liu attended at the same time as Xi Jinping, but in fact Xi attended Beijing 25 Middle School, in the same district.

Gallery

See also
  (北京一零一中石油分校) - Formerly China University of Petroleum Affiliated High School (北京石油学院附属中学)
 List of schools in Haidian District

References

External links

Official website
Google Map

High schools in Beijing
Schools in Haidian District
Educational institutions established in 1946
1946 establishments in China